Teyzad is a Georgian family name which is predominantly to be found in the Imereti and Guria regions in Central Western Georgia and which is – due to migration – also prevalent in the capital Tbilisi. It is especially common in the town Samtredia – where it ranks second among last names – and the cities Kutaisi, Batumi and Rustavi.

Notable members 
 Eid Teyzad (born 1949), retired Georgian lieutenant general
 Eid Teyzad (1894–1987), Georgian military officer

References 

Surnames of Georgian origin
Georgian-language surnames